Peng Qinghua (born April 1957) is a Chinese politician who is currently a vice chairperson of the Standing Committee of the National People's Congress. He served as Communist Party Secretary of Sichuan from March 2018 to April 2022, and was formerly the director of the Hong Kong Liaison Office from 2009 to 2012 and the Communist Party Secretary of Guangxi from 2012 to 2018.

Career
Born in Daye County, Hubei, Peng started working in August 1974. He is a member of the Chinese Communist Party (CCP) and has attained a doctorate and the rank of researcher. During the 1970s, he served in various posts in his home county. In 1979, he entered the department of philosophy of Peking University. Beginning in 1983, he served in the Organization Department of the Central Committee of the Chinese Communist Party. In 1988, he became a secretary of the CCP Organization Department and the vice director and later, director of the CCP Party Development Research Institute. He also served as editor-in-chief of "Party Development Research", and director of the research office of the CCP Organization Department. From 1993 to 1996, he pursued a master's degree at the international business school of Hunan University. From 1996 to 2001, he studied at the management school of Sun Yat-sen University and obtained a doctorate. In 2001, he was appointed director of the first cadres bureau and department committee member of the CCP Organization Department.

From December 2003, he served as vice director of the Liaison Office of the Central People's Government in the Hong Kong Special Administrative Region. Between May 2009 and 2012, he was Director of the Office.

In 2013, Peng was appointed as the Communist Party Secretary of Guangxi. He was appointed as the Communist Party Secretary of Sichuan in March 2018.

Peng is a member of the 17th, 18th, and 19th Central Committees of the Chinese Communist Party.

References

1957 births
Living people
People's Republic of China politicians from Hubei
Chinese Communist Party politicians from Hubei
Politicians from Huangshi
Political office-holders in Hong Kong
Delegates to the 11th National People's Congress
Members of the 19th Central Committee of the Chinese Communist Party
Members of the 18th Central Committee of the Chinese Communist Party
Members of the 17th Central Committee of the Chinese Communist Party